Revenants is the second studio album by American deathcore band, Conducting from the Grave.

Track listing

Credits
Conducting from the Grave
Mikey Powell – lead vocals 
Greg Donnelly – drums 
Steven Lovas – bass guitar 
John Abernathy – guitar 
Jeff Morgan – guitar 
Additional personnel
Kevin Randleman – engineering
Casey Sabol – engineering
Zack Ohren – engineering, mastering, mixing

References

2010 albums
Sumerian Records albums
Conducting from the Grave albums